is a Japanese footballer currently playing as a defender for Geylang International. He is the brother of fellow professional footballer Kohei Tezuka.

On January 23, 2021, it was announced that he would join Albirex Niigata. 

On 14 November 2021, he transferred to Geylang International for the 2022 season. 

He started the season as a centre-back, but moving upfield has added another dimension to his game as the season move on.

Career statistics

Club
.

Notes

References

1998 births
Living people
Association football people from Tochigi Prefecture
University of Tsukuba alumni
Japanese footballers
Japanese expatriate footballers
Association football defenders
Tochigi SC players
Albirex Niigata Singapore FC players
Geylang International FC players
Japanese expatriate sportspeople in Singapore
Expatriate footballers in Singapore